Haydon Bridge Viaduct carries the A69 Haydon Bridge bypass across both the  to  railway and the River South Tyne, about  west of Haydon Bridge.

History
Construction, which was undertaken by CVC Highway Solutions (a joint venture between Volker Stevin and Hanson Contracting and their design partner Capita Symonds), started in January 2007 and the bridge opened on 25 March 2009.

References

Bridges in Northumberland
Crossings of the River Tyne